A polo coat, also known as a camel coat, is a men's overcoat associated with polo players in England. Camelhair was the fabric at first, but later camelhair and wool blends became standard due to its higher durability. The terms polo coat and camel coat are thus synonymous.

See also
Polo cloth
Overcoat
Chesterfield coat
Covert coat
Paletot
Duffle coat
Pea coat
Trench coat

References

Coats (clothing)